Operation Bürkl (operacja Bürkl), or the special combat action Bürkl (specjalna akcja bojowa Bürkl), was an operation by the Polish resistance conducted on 7 September 1943. It was the second action of Operation Heads, a series of assassinations of notorious SS officers in Warsaw carried out by the Kedyw's special group Agat ("Anti-Gestapo") between 1943 and 1944, and their first success.

History
The goal of the operation was to "liquidate" Franz Bürkl, a notorious Sicherheitspolizei NCO who had been sentenced to death by the Polish Underground courts for the murder of at least several dozen people. Bürkl was ambushed in broad daylight on the city's main Marszałkowska Street by a group of five young AK partisans armed with Sten submachine guns and Filipinka hand grenades. The assassins, led by 21-year-old Jerzy Zborowski, were recruited for Agat from the underground scouting organization Szare Szeregi. Bürkl and seven other German policemen were killed in the 90-second shoot-out. While the operation resulted in no losses for the resistance, the Nazis killed 20 inmates of Pawiak prison in a public execution in reprisal.

References

Bibliography

See also
Operation Kutschera

External links
 Specjalna operacja bojowa Bürkl
 Specjalna operacja bojowa Bürkl  (a different article)

1943 in Poland
Nazis assassinated by Polish resistance
Assassinations in Poland
History of Warsaw
Bürkl
Scouting and Guiding in Poland
General Government